Gymnastyorka (usually transliterated in English as Gimnasterka; also spelled Gymnastiorka) was a Russian military smock comprising a pullover-style garment with a standing collar having double button closure. Additionally, one or two upper chest pockets, with or without flaps, may have been worn. It had provision for shoulder boards (epaulettes or shoulder straps) and sometimes reinforced elbows and cuffs. The Tsarist version had the standing collar while the M35 version had a stand-and-fall collar which was replaced with the standing collar in the M43 version. The Soviet Army M35 version usually had hidden buttons. A double breasted version (kitel) for officers of all ranks existed during the Tsarist period.

Origins

The gymnastyorka (till 1917 officially named "gymnastic tunic", гимнастическая рубаха) was originally introduced into the Imperial Russian Army in about 1870 for wear by regiments stationed in Turkestan during the hot summers. It took the form of a loose fitting white linen "shirt-tunic" and included the coloured shoulder-boards of the dark green tunic worn during the remainder of the year. The gymnastyorka was taken into use by all branches of the Imperial Russian Army at the time of the Russo-Turkish War of 1877–1878.  Originally intended as a working dress during peacetime and patterned on the traditional Russian peasant smock, the gymnastyorka was subsequently adopted for ordinary duties and active service wear. It was worn as such by non-commissioned ranks in summer during the 1890s and early 1900s. The officers' equivalent was a white double breasted tunic or kitel.  During the Russo-Japanese War of 1904–1905 the white gymnastyorka with its red or blue shoulder-boards proved too conspicuous against modern weaponry and the garments were often dyed various shades of khaki. The smartness and comfort of the white gymnastyorka enabled it to survive for a few more years of peacetime wear until a light khaki version was adopted in 1907-09 and worn during World War I.

Post-Revolution
After the Russian Revolution of 1917, a new version of the gymnastyorka with a stand-and-fall collar was issued to the Bolshevik forces, with three razgovory straps sown across the chest in branch colours. During the Russian Civil War, both the counter-revolutionary White Army and the Bolshevik Red Army wore gymnastyorkas, White Army troops were issued with new black gymnastyorkas of the original Imperial pattern, some of them wore old khaki-green or white ones, but all of them had shoulder-boards. The Bolshevik Red Army wore both original Imperial pattern shirt-tunics and ones of a new model, with or without the coloured stripes, but some added with two breast pockets. The wide variety of uniforms worn by both sides during the Civil War arose from supply and production difficulties in the chaotic conditions of the time.

In 1924 the shoulder straps were abolished, and in 1935 the gymnastyorka was modified to accommodate the reintroduction of personal ranks in the Red Army. The M35 version was slightly modified on 1 August 1941 after the experience of the Winter War, replacing the colorful rank collar tabs, with duller and subdued ones. In 1943 the traditional Tsarist version with stand collar and shoulder-boards was reintroduced, replacing the M35 gymnastyorka. The M43 remained in service until the gymnastyorka was finally abolished in 1969.

Other users
The gymnastyorka was also adopted by several Soviet satellite states such as Bulgaria, Mongolia, Albania, and North Korea. Enlisted soldiers in the North Korean Army continue to wear the gymnastyorka as part of their field uniform.

The Tsarist police also wore the white gymnastyorka as a summer garment until 1917. Their successors, the Soviet Militsiya, continued to wear this traditional garment until the 1950s.

See also
 Kosovorotka
 List of Russian inventions
 Military uniform
 Pilotka

References

1870s fashion
19th-century fashion
20th-century fashion
Military uniforms
Russian clothing
Soviet military uniforms
Uniforms